The Corridor is a 1968 Swedish drama film directed by Jan Halldoff. It was entered into the 6th Moscow International Film Festival.

Cast
 Per Ragnar as Dr. Jan Eriksson
 Agneta Ekmanner as Kerstin
 Ann Norstedt as Maria
 Åke Lindström as The Father
 Inga Landgré as The Mother
 Gunnar Biörck as Professor Gunnar Bjork
 Leif Liljeroth as Dr. Forslund
 Lars Amble as Stig

References

External links
 
 

1968 films
1968 drama films
Swedish drama films
1960s Swedish-language films
Films directed by Jan Halldoff
1960s Swedish films